The Bangladesh College of Physicians & Surgeons (BCPS) is a professional membership body dedicated to improving the practice of medicine, chiefly through the accreditation of doctors by examination. It organizes examinations for Fellowship (FCPS) and Membership (MCPS).

Publication
The Journal of Bangladesh College of Physicians & Surgeons (ISSN 1015-0870) is the official journal of BCPS.

Notable Fellows
More than 7,000 people have been named a Fellow of the Bangladesh College of Physicians and Surgeons, since its inception in 1972. The Bangladesh College of Physicians and Surgeons publishes a database of all fellows.

Politicians
 Lotay Tshering

Physicians
 Sayeba Akhter
 Abul Bashar Mohammed Khurshid Alam
 Kanak Kanti Barua
 Pranab Kumar Chowdhury
 Syed Atiqul Haq
 A. K. M. Fazlul Haque
 Mahmud Hasan
 Quazi Deen Mohammad
 Quazi Tarikul Islam
 Touhidul Anowar Chawdhury

References

External links
  Official website

Health sciences schools in Bangladesh
Universities and colleges in Dhaka
Medical colleges in Bangladesh